Anthony David Madison (born October 8, 1981) is a former American football defensive back. He was signed by the Pittsburgh Steelers as an undrafted free agent in 2006. He appeared in 2 Super Bowls and winning Super Bowl XLIII against the Arizona Cardinals. He played college football at Alabama.

Early years
Madison went to high school in Thomasville.  He played quarterback, wide receiver, running back, defensive back and returned kicks.  He was a two-time all-state pick. Rivals top 100 and was considered by many to be a Charlie Ward type athlete. He received numerous scholarship offers from the likes of Auburn, Ole Miss and LSU but ultimately choosing to play for The University of Alabama.  His high school career stats include 14 interceptions and over 4,000 yards of offense. He was considered a top basketball player, where he earned all state honors.

College career
Madison played his collegiate football at the University of Alabama.  He started 37 out of the 50 games with140 tackles, 5 interceptions, and 30 passes defensed. He earned team awards such as: Committed to Excellence, Most improved Corner, Jerry Duncan I Like to Practice Award and Charlie Compton award, which is given to the player who exemplifies faith and hard work. All Bowl Team (2005) honorable mention All SEC (2005).  Bachelors in 3 1/2 years with Marketing degree. May 2016 he earned a master's degree in mental health counseling at California State University, Fullerton.

Professional career

Anthony Madison is a Super bowl winning cornerback who participated in Super Bowl 43 and 45. He also boast 2 AFC Championships.

Pittsburgh Steelers

Madison was signed as an undrafted free agent by the Pittsburgh Steelers in 2006. He spent the first 4 weeks of the 2006 season on the practice squad before he was added to the active roster to fill a hole in the lineup left by the injury of cornerback Ricardo Colclough. His rookie season stats include 12 tackles (10 solo) in 13 games.

Tampa Bay Buccaneers
Madison played for the Tampa Bay Buccaneers during the 2006 season.

Pittsburgh Steelers (second stint)
Madison re-signed with the Steelers in 2007. In 2008, Madison played in every game for the Steelers including Super Bowl XLIII, where he collected 2 solo tackles and added a team high 32  special teams tackles. He was named A pro bowl alternate for special teams.

Cleveland Browns
Madison signed with the Cleveland Browns on September 22, 2009. He was waived on November 3.

Indianapolis Colts
Madison was signed by the Indianapolis Colts on November 10, 2009. He was waived on December 1.

Pittsburgh Steelers (third stint)
Madison was claimed off waivers by the Pittsburgh Steelers on December 2, 2009. He was crowned AFC Champion and advanced to the Super bowl where they lost to Green Bay Packers. He led the team in special teams tackles with 28 and recorded an interception during the season.

Detroit Lions
On August 13, 2011, Madison signed with the Detroit Lions, but was released on September 3. He was re-signed by Detroit on September 27 and released on November 7 along with Eldra Buckley to make room for free agent signings Leonard Davis and Kevin Smith (running back).

Pittsburgh Steelers (fourth stint)
On January 2, 2012, Madison re-signed with Pittsburgh for the playoffs, which would be the final game of his career. He retired during the offseason of 2012.

References

External links
 Pittsburgh Steelers bio

1981 births
Living people
People from Thomasville, Alabama
Players of American football from Alabama
American football cornerbacks
American football safeties
Alabama Crimson Tide football players
Tampa Bay Buccaneers players
Pittsburgh Steelers players
Cleveland Browns players
Indianapolis Colts players
Detroit Lions players